Kansas Township may refer to one of the following places in the State of Illinois:

 Kansas Township, Edgar County, Illinois
 Kansas Township, Woodford County, Illinois

See also

 Kansas (disambiguation)

Kansas